Andy Samberg (born David A. J. Samberg; August 18, 1978) is an American comedian, actor, musician, writer, and producer. Samberg is a member of the comedy music group The Lonely Island alongside childhood friends Akiva Schaffer and Jorma Taccone. He was also a cast member and writer for the NBC sketch comedy series Saturday Night Live from 2005 to 2012, where he and his fellow group members are credited with popularizing the SNL Digital Shorts.

Samberg's film roles include Hot Rod (2007), Space Chimps (2008), I Love You, Man (2009), the Cloudy with a Chance of Meatballs film series (2009–2013), That's My Boy (2012), Celeste and Jesse Forever (2012), the Hotel Transylvania film series (2012–2022), Popstar: Never Stop Never Stopping (2016), Storks (2016), Palm Springs (2020), America: The Motion Picture (2021), and Chip 'n Dale: Rescue Rangers (2022). From 2013 to 2021, he starred as Jake Peralta in the Fox, and later NBC, police sitcom Brooklyn Nine-Nine which he also produced. For his work on the show, he was awarded a Golden Globe Award for Best Actor – Television Series Musical or Comedy in 2013.

Early life and education
Samberg was born in Berkeley, California on August 18, 1978. His mother, Marjorie "Margi" (née Marrow), is a retired teacher, who taught at John Muir Elementary School, and his father, Joe Samberg, is a photographer. He has two sisters, Johanna and Darrow. At age 5, he told his parents that he wanted to change his name to Andy. Samberg was raised in a Jewish family and considers himself "not particularly religious." He also has Italian heritage. He attended Chabot Elementary School with his future Brooklyn Nine Nine co-star Chelsea Peretti.

In a 2019 episode of Finding Your Roots, hosted by Henry Louis Gates Jr., Samberg discovered that his mother Marjorie, who was adopted by Jewish parents, is the biological daughter of a Sicilian Roman Catholic father named Salvatore Maida, who immigrated in 1925, and a German-Jewish refugee mother named Ellen Philipsborn, who had come to the US in 1938; they met in San Francisco. Samberg is a third cousin of U.S. Senator Tammy Baldwin (D-WI), and his adoptive maternal grandfather was industrial psychologist and philanthropist Alfred J. Marrow.

Samberg graduated from Berkeley High School in 1996, where he became interested in creative writing and has stated that writing classes "were the ones that [he] put all [his] effort into... that's what [he] cared about and that's what [he] ended up doing". He attended college at University of California, Santa Cruz for two years before transferring to New York University (NYU)'s Tisch School of the Arts, where he graduated in 2000. While at NYU, writer Murray Miller was his roommate.

Career

Acting and filmmaking 
Samberg majored in experimental film. He became an online star and made his own comedy videos with his friends Akiva Schaffer and Jorma Taccone. When YouTube was created in 2005, the streaming of their videos became much more widespread. Samberg became a featured player on Saturday Night Live in part because of the work he had done on his sketch comedy website TheLonelyIsland.com, which helped them land an agent and eventually get hired at Saturday Night Live. Prior to joining its cast, Samberg was (and remains) a member of the comedy troupe the Lonely Island, along with Taccone and Schaffer. The trio began writing for Saturday Night Live in 2005 and released their debut album Incredibad in 2009. Samberg appeared in numerous theatrical films, commercials, music videos, and hosted special events, including the 2009 MTV Movie Awards.

In 2012, Samberg delivered the Class Day speech at Harvard University, and he starred with Adam Sandler in That's My Boy. The same year, he starred in Hotel Transylvania as the main character, Jonathan, a role he reprised for its sequels Hotel Transylvania 2 and Hotel Transylvania 3: Summer Vacation. In September 2012, Samberg played Cuckoo in the BAFTA nominated BBC Three series Cuckoo; and, in 2013, he landed the role of Detective Jake Peralta in Fox's (now NBC's) police sitcom Brooklyn Nine-Nine, which first aired on September 17 of the same year. Samberg won the Golden Globe Award for Best Actor – Television Series Musical or Comedy in 2014 for his role as Peralta. Samberg hosted the 67th Primetime Emmy Awards on September 20, 2015. Years later, he co-hosted the 76th Golden Globe Awards with Sandra Oh on January 6, 2019.

Samberg starred in Sleater-Kinney's "No Cities to Love" video along with other actors such as Fred Armisen, Elliot Page, and Norman Reedus. On May 16, 2016, Samberg and the Lonely Island performed their 2009 hit "I'm on a Boat" with classroom instruments on The Tonight Show Starring Jimmy Fallon, as part of a recurring segment on the show.

Saturday Night Live 
In September 2005, Samberg joined Saturday Night Live as a featured player and writer. Though his live sketch roles were limited in his first year, he appeared in many prerecorded sketches including commercial parodies and various other filmed segments. On December 17, 2005, he co-starred with castmate Chris Parnell in the Digital Short show "Lazy Sunday", a hip hop song about a quest to see the film The Chronicles of Narnia: The Lion, the Witch and the Wardrobe. The short became an Internet phenomenon and garnered Samberg significant media and public attention. Acclaim continued, especially for "Dick in a Box", a duet with Justin Timberlake that won a Creative Arts Emmy for Outstanding Original Music and Lyrics. The video for his comedy troupe's collaboration with T-Pain, "I'm on a Boat", had over 56 million views on YouTube, after debuting on February 7, 2009. The song was nominated for a Grammy Award. Another digital short, "Motherlover", also featuring Timberlake, was released on May 10, 2009, to commemorate Mother's Day. Outside of his prerecorded segments, he participated in recurring live segments, such as his Blizzard Man sketch. On June 1, 2012, Samberg's spokesperson announced that Samberg had left the show. He returned to the show to host the Season 39 finale in 2014 and to host the 40th anniversary special's Digital Short.

Personal life 
Samberg knew his Brooklyn Nine-Nine co-star Chelsea Peretti before they starred in the show, as they met each other in elementary school and have been acquaintances ever since.

Samberg is married to musician Joanna Newsom. He once described himself as a "superfan", and they met at one of her concerts. After five years of dating, Samberg proposed to her in February 2013, and they married on September 21, 2013, in Big Sur, California, with Saturday Night Live co-star Seth Meyers serving as Samberg’s groomsman. In March 2014, Samberg and Newsom purchased the Moorcrest estate in the Beachwood Canyon area of Los Angeles, California, which was associated with various historical figures: in the 1920s, it was owned by the parents of actress Mary Astor; and, prior to that Charlie Chaplin rented the estate. The couple also owns a home in Manhattan's West Village. They announced the birth of their daughter on August 8, 2017,. The birth of Samberg and Newsom's second child was announced by The Lonely Island's Jorma Taccone, in February 2023.

Samberg, who grew up in the East Bay, is a fan of the Oakland Athletics and the Golden State Warriors.

Filmography

Film

Television

Video games

Awards and nominations

References

External links 

 The Lonely Island
 Andy Samberg profile
 Short Movies with Andy Samberg at Channel 101
 Samberg SNL video archive at Yahoo Screen

1978 births
Living people
21st-century American comedians
21st-century American male actors
21st-century American male musicians
21st-century American male writers
21st-century American rappers
American Ashkenazi Jews
American baritones
American comedy musicians
American dramatists and playwrights
American impressionists (entertainers)
American Internet celebrities
American male comedians
American male dramatists and playwrights
American male film actors
American male rappers
American male screenwriters
American male television actors
American male television writers
American male voice actors
American people of German-Jewish descent
American people of Italian descent
American people of Polish-Jewish descent
American people of Russian-Jewish descent
American sketch comedians
American television writers
Berkeley High School (Berkeley, California) alumni
Best Musical or Comedy Actor Golden Globe (television) winners
Comedians from California
Jewish American comedians
Jewish American dramatists and playwrights
Jewish American male actors
Jewish American male comedians
Jewish male comedians
Jewish rappers
Male actors from Berkeley, California
Male actors from California
Musicians from Berkeley, California
People from Greenwich Village
People of Sicilian descent
Primetime Emmy Award winners
Rappers from California
Screenwriters from California
The Lonely Island members
Tisch School of the Arts alumni
University of California, Santa Cruz alumni
Writers from Berkeley, California